William Boyd Watterson II (born July 5, 1958) is an American cartoonist and the author of the comic strip Calvin and Hobbes, which was syndicated from 1985 to 1995. Watterson stopped drawing Calvin and Hobbes at the end of 1995, with a short statement to newspaper editors and his readers that he felt he had achieved all he could in the medium. Watterson is known for his negative views on comic syndication and licensing, his efforts to expand and elevate the newspaper comic as an art form, and his move back into private life after he stopped drawing Calvin and Hobbes. Watterson was born in Washington, D.C., and grew up in Chagrin Falls, Ohio. The suburban Midwestern United States setting of Ohio was part of the inspiration for Calvin and Hobbes.

Early life
Watterson was born on July 5, 1958, in Washington, D.C., to Kathryn Watterson (1933-2022) and James Godfrey Watterson. His father worked as a patent attorney. In 1965, six-year-old Watterson and his family moved to Chagrin Falls, Ohio, a suburb of Cleveland. Watterson has a younger brother, Thomas Watterson.

Watterson drew his first cartoon at age eight, and spent much time in childhood alone, drawing and cartooning. This continued through his school years, during which time he discovered comic strips such as Pogo, Krazy Kat, and Charles Schulz' Peanuts which subsequently inspired and influenced his desire to become a professional cartoonist. On one occasion when he was in fourth grade, he wrote a letter to Charles Schulz, who responded, much to Watterson's surprise.  This made a big impression on him at the time. His parents encouraged him in his artistic pursuits. Later, they recalled him as a "conservative child" — imaginative, but "not in a fantasy way", and certainly nothing like the character of Calvin that he later created. Watterson found avenues for his cartooning talents throughout primary and secondary school, creating high school-themed super hero comics with his friends and contributing cartoons and art to the school newspaper and yearbook.

After high school, Watterson attended Kenyon College, where he majored in political science. He had already decided on a career in cartooning, but he felt studying political science would help him move into editorial cartooning. He continued to develop his art skills, and during his sophomore year he painted Michelangelo's Creation of Adam on the ceiling of his dormitory room. He also contributed cartoons to the college newspaper, some of which included the original "Spaceman Spiff" cartoons. Watterson graduated from Kenyon in 1980 with a Bachelor of Arts degree.

Later, when Watterson was creating names for the characters in his comic strip, he decided on Calvin (after the Protestant reformer John Calvin) and Hobbes (after the social philosopher Thomas Hobbes), allegedly as a "tip of the hat" to Kenyon's political science department. In The Complete Calvin and Hobbes, Watterson stated that Calvin was named for "a 16th-century theologian who believed in predestination," and Hobbes for "a 17th-century philosopher with a dim view of human nature."

Career

Early work
Watterson was inspired by the work of The Cincinnati Enquirer political cartoonist Jim Borgman, a 1976 graduate of Kenyon College, and decided to try to follow the same career path as Borgman, who in turn offered support and encouragement to the aspiring artist. Watterson graduated in 1980 and was hired on a trial basis at the Cincinnati Post, a competing paper of the Enquirer. Watterson quickly discovered that the job was full of unexpected challenges which prevented him from performing his duties to the standards set for him.  Not the least of these challenges was his unfamiliarity with the Cincinnati political scene, as he had never resided in or near the city, having grown up in the Cleveland area and attending college in central Ohio. The Post fired Watterson before his contract was up.

He then joined a small advertising agency and worked there for four years as a designer, creating grocery advertisements while also working on his own projects, including development of his own cartoon strip and contributions to Target: The Political Cartoon Quarterly.

As a freelance artist, Watterson has drawn other works for various merchandise, including album art for his brother's band, calendars, clothing graphics, educational books, magazine covers, posters, and post cards.

Calvin and Hobbes and rise to success
Watterson has said that he works for personal fulfillment. As he told the graduating class of 1990 at Kenyon College, "It's surprising how hard we'll work when the work is done just for ourselves." Calvin and Hobbes was first published on November 18, 1985. In Calvin and Hobbes Tenth Anniversary Book, he wrote that his influences included Charles Schulz's Peanuts, Walt Kelly's Pogo, and George Herriman's Krazy Kat. Watterson wrote the introduction to the first volume of The Komplete Kolor Krazy Kat. Watterson's style also reflects the influence of Winsor McCay's Little Nemo in Slumberland.

Like many artists, Watterson incorporated elements of his life, interests, beliefs, and values into his work—for example, his hobby as a cyclist, memories of his own father's speeches about "building character", and his views on merchandising and corporations. Watterson's cat Sprite very much inspired the personality and physical features of Hobbes.

Watterson spent much of his career trying to change the climate of newspaper comics. He believed that the artistic value of comics was being undermined, and that the space which they occupied in newspapers continually decreased, subject to arbitrary whims of shortsighted publishers. Furthermore, he opined that art should not be judged by the medium for which it is created (i.e., there is no "high" art or "low" art—just art).

Watterson wrote forewords for FoxTrot and For Better or For Worse.

Fight against merchandising his characters
For years, Watterson battled against pressure from publishers to merchandise his work, something that he felt would cheapen his comic through compromising the act of creation or reading.

He refused to merchandise his creations on the grounds that displaying Calvin and Hobbes images on commercially sold mugs, stickers, and T-shirts would devalue the characters and their personalities. Watterson said that Universal kept putting pressure on him and said that he had signed his contract without fully perusing it because, as a new artist, he was happy to find a syndicate willing to give him a chance (two other syndicates had previously turned him down). He added that the contract was so one-sided that, if Universal really wanted to, they could license his characters against his will, and could even fire him and continue Calvin and Hobbes with a new artist. Watterson's position eventually won out and he was able to renegotiate his contract so that he would receive all rights to his work, but later added that the licensing fight exhausted him and contributed to the need for a nine-month sabbatical in 1991.

Despite Watterson's efforts, many unofficial knockoffs have been found, including items that depict Calvin and Hobbes consuming alcohol or Calvin urinating on a logo. Watterson has said, "Only thieves and vandals have made money on Calvin and Hobbes merchandise."

Changing the format of the Sunday strip
Watterson was critical of the prevailing format for the Sunday comic strip that was in place when he began drawing (and remained so, to varying degrees). The typical layout consists of three rows with eight total squares, which take up half a page if published with its normal size. (In this context, half-page is an absolute sizeapproximately half a nominal  page sizeand not related to the actual page size on which a cartoon might eventually be printed for distribution.) Some newspapers are restricted with space for their Sunday features and reduce the size of the strip. One of the more common ways is to cut out the top two panels, which Watterson believed forced him to waste the space on throwaway jokes that did not always fit the strip. While he was set to return from his first sabbatical (a second took place during 1994), Watterson discussed with his syndicate a new format for Calvin and Hobbes that would enable him to use his space more efficiently and would almost require the papers to publish it as a half-page. Universal agreed that they would sell the strip as the half-page and nothing else, which garnered anger from papers and criticism for Watterson from both editors and some of his fellow cartoonists (whom he described as "unnecessarily hot-tempered"). Eventually, Universal compromised and agreed to offer papers a choice between the full half-page or a reduced-sized version to alleviate concerns about the size issue. Watterson conceded that this caused him to lose space in many papers, but he said that, in the end, it was a benefit because he felt that he was giving the papers' readers a better strip for their money and editors were free not to run Calvin and Hobbes at their own risk. He added that he was not going to apologize for drawing a popular feature.

End of Calvin and Hobbes
On November 9, 1995, Watterson announced the end of Calvin and Hobbes with the following letter to newspaper editors:

The last strip of Calvin and Hobbes was published on December 31, 1995.

After Calvin and Hobbes
In the years since Calvin and Hobbes was ended, many attempts have been made to contact Watterson. Both The Plain Dealer and the Cleveland Scene sent reporters, in 1998 and 2003 respectively, but neither were able to make contact with the media-shy Watterson.  Since 1995, Watterson has taken up painting, at one point drawing landscapes of the woods with his father. He has kept away from the public eye and shown no interest in resuming the strip, creating new works based on the strip's characters, or embarking on new commercial projects, though he has published several Calvin and Hobbes "treasury collection" anthologies. He does not sign autographs or license his characters, staying true to his stated principles. Watterson was once known to sneak autographed copies of his books onto the shelves of the Fireside Bookshop, a family-owned bookstore in his hometown of Chagrin Falls, Ohio. He ended this practice after discovering that some of the autographed books were being sold online for high prices.

Watterson rarely gives interviews or makes public appearances. His lengthiest interviews include the cover story in The Comics Journal No. 127 in February 1989, an interview that appeared in a 1987 issue of Honk Magazine, and one in a 2015 Watterson exhibition catalogue.

On December 21, 1999, a short piece was published in the Los Angeles Times, written by Watterson to mark the forthcoming retirement of iconic Peanuts creator Charles Schulz.

Circa 2003, Gene Weingarten of The Washington Post sent Watterson the first edition of the Barnaby book as an incentive, hoping to land an interview. Weingarten passed the book to Watterson's parents, along with a message, and declared that he would wait in his hotel for as long as it took Watterson to contact him. Watterson's editor Lee Salem called the next day to tell Weingarten that the cartoonist would not be coming.

In 2004, Watterson and his wife Melissa bought a home in the Cleveland suburb of Cleveland Heights, Ohio. In 2005, they completed the move from their home in Chagrin Falls to their new residence.

In October 2005, Watterson answered 15 questions submitted by readers. In October 2007, he wrote a review of Schulz and Peanuts, a biography of Charles Schulz, in The Wall Street Journal.

In 2008, he provided a foreword for the first book collection of Richard Thompson's Cul de Sac comic strip. In April 2011, a representative for Andrews McMeel received a package from a "William Watterson in Cleveland Heights, Ohio" which contained a  oil-on-board painting of Cul de Sac character Petey Otterloop, done by Watterson for the Team Cul de Sac fundraising project for Parkinson's disease in honor of Richard Thompson, who was diagnosed in 2009. Watterson's syndicate (which ultimately became Universal Uclick) revealed that the painting was the first new artwork of his that the syndicate has seen since Calvin and Hobbes ended in 1995.

October 2009 saw the publication of Looking for Calvin and Hobbes, Nevin Martell's humorous story of seeking an interview with Watterson.  In his search he interviews friends, co-workers and family but never gets to meet the artist himself.

In early 2010, Watterson was interviewed by The Plain Dealer on the 15th anniversary of the end of Calvin and Hobbes. Explaining his decision to discontinue the strip, he said,

In October 2013, the magazine Mental Floss published an interview with Watterson, only the second since the strip ended. Watterson again confirmed that he would not be revisiting Calvin and Hobbes, and that he was satisfied with his decision. He also gave his opinion on the changes in the comic-strip industry and where it would be headed in the future:

In 2013 the documentary Dear Mr. Watterson, exploring the cultural impact of Calvin and Hobbes, was released. Watterson himself did not appear in the film.

On February 26, 2014, Watterson published his first cartoon since the end of Calvin and Hobbes: a poster for the documentary Stripped.

In 2014, Watterson co-authored The Art of Richard Thompson with Washington Post cartoonist Nick Galifianakis and David Apatoff.

In June 2014, three strips of Pearls Before Swine (published June 4, June 5, and June 6, 2014) featured guest illustrations by Watterson after mutual friend Nick Galifianakis connected him and cartoonist Stephan Pastis, who communicated via e-mail. Pastis likened this unexpected collaboration to getting "a glimpse of Bigfoot". "I thought maybe Stephan and I could do this goofy collaboration and then use the result to raise some money for Parkinson's research in honor of Richard Thompson. It seemed like a perfect convergence", Watterson told The Washington Post.  The day that Stephan Pastis returned to his own strip, he paid tribute to Watterson by alluding to the final strip of Calvin and Hobbes from December 31, 1995.

On November 5, 2014, a poster was unveiled, drawn by Watterson for the 2015 Angoulême International Comics Festival where he was awarded the Grand Prix in 2014.

On April 1, 2016, for April Fools' Day, Berkeley Breathed posted on Facebook that Watterson had signed "the franchise over to my 'administration'". He then posted a comic with Calvin, Hobbes, and Opus all featured. The comic is signed by Watterson, though the degree of his involvement was speculative. Breathed posted another "Calvin County" strip featuring Calvin and Hobbes, also "signed" by Watterson on April 1, 2017, along with a fake New York Times story ostensibly detailing the "merger" of the two strips. Berkeley Breathed included Hobbes in a November 27, 2017, strip as a stand-in for the character Steve Dallas.  Hobbes has also returned in the June 9, 11, and 12, 2021, strips as a stand-in for Bill The Cat.

Collaborating with American caricaturist, John Kascht, Watterson authored "a fable for grown-ups" called The Mysteries set to be released on October 10, 2023 via Andrews McMeel Publishing.

Exhibitions
In 2001, the Billy Ireland Cartoon Library & Museum at Ohio State University mounted an exhibition of Watterson's Sunday strips. He chose thirty-six of his favorites, displaying them with both the original drawing and the colored finished product, with most pieces featuring personal annotations. Watterson also wrote an accompanying essay that served as the foreword for the exhibit, called "Calvin and Hobbes: Sunday Pages 1985–1995", which opened on September 10, 2001. It was taken down in January 2002.  The accompanying published catalog had the same title.

From March 22 to August 3, 2014, Watterson exhibited again at the Billy Ireland Cartoon Library & Museum at Ohio State University.  In conjunction with this exhibition, Watterson also participated in an interview with the school. An exhibition catalog named Exploring Calvin and Hobbes was released with the exhibit. The book contained a lengthy interview with Bill Watterson, conducted by Jenny Robb, the curator of the museum.

Awards and honors
Watterson was awarded the National Cartoonists Society's Reuben Award in both 1986 and 1988.  Watterson's second Reuben win made him the youngest cartoonist to be so honored, and only the sixth person to win twice, following Milton Caniff, Charles Schulz, Dik Browne, Chester Gould, and Jeff MacNelly.  (Gary Larson is the only cartoonist to win a second Reuben since Watterson.)  In 2014, Watterson was awarded the Grand Prix at the Angoulême International Comics Festival for his body of work, becoming just the fourth non-European cartoonist to be so honored in the first 41 years of the event.

1986: Reuben Award, Outstanding Cartoonist of the Year
1988: Reuben Award, Outstanding Cartoonist of the Year
1988: National Cartoonists Society, Newspaper Comic Strips Humor Award
1988: Sproing Award, for Tommy og Tigern (Calvin and Hobbes)
1989: Harvey Award, Special Award for Humor, for Calvin and Hobbes
1990: Harvey Award, Best Syndicated Comic Strip, for Calvin and Hobbes
1990: Max & Moritz Prize, Best Comic Strip, for Calvin and Hobbes
1991: Harvey Award, Best Syndicated Comic Strip, for Calvin and Hobbes
1991: Adamson Award, for Kalle och Hobbe (Calvin and Hobbes)
1992: Harvey Award, Best Syndicated Comic Strip, for Calvin and Hobbes
1992: Eisner Award, Best Comic Strip Collection, for The Revenge of the Baby-Sat
1992: Angoulême International Comics Festival, Prize for Best Foreign Comic Book, for En avant tête de thon!
1993: Eisner Award, Best Comic Strip Collection, for Attack of the Deranged Mutant Killer Monster Snow Goons
1993: Harvey Award, Best Syndicated Comic Strip, for Calvin and Hobbes
1994: Harvey Award, Best Syndicated Comic Strip, for Calvin and Hobbes
1995: Harvey Award, Best Syndicated Comic Strip, for Calvin and Hobbes
1996: Harvey Award, Best Syndicated Comic Strip, for Calvin and Hobbes
2014: Grand Prix, Angoulême International Comics Festival
2020: Inducted into the Will Eisner Award Hall of Fame

Bibliography

1987: Calvin and Hobbes
1988: Something Under the Bed is Drooling
1988: Yukon Ho!
1990: Weirdos from Another Planet
1991: The Revenge of the Baby-Sat
1991: Scientific Progress Goes "Boink"
1992: Attack of the Deranged Mutant Killer Monster Snow Goons
1993: The Days are Just Packed
1994: Homicidal Psycho Jungle Cat: A Calvin and Hobbes Collection
1995: The Calvin and Hobbes Tenth Anniversary Book
1996: There's Treasure Everywhere
1996: It's a Magical World
2023: The Mysteries

Treasury collections

1988: The Essential Calvin and Hobbes
1989: The Lazy Sunday Book
1990: The Authoritative Calvin and Hobbes
1992: The Indispensable Calvin and Hobbes
2002: Calvin and Hobbes Sunday Pages 1985–1995
2005: The Complete Calvin and Hobbes
2019: The Complete Calvin and Hobbes (reprint)

Notes

References

External links

 
 
 
 .
 
 ,  Bill Watterson's Commencement Address to Kenyon College.
 .

1958 births
American comic strip cartoonists
American people of English descent
Artists from Washington, D.C.
 
Grand Prix de la ville d'Angoulême winners
Harvey Award winners
Kenyon College alumni
Living people
People from Chagrin Falls, Ohio
Reuben Award winners